James Graeffe (7 July 1921 – 1994) was a Belgian speed skater. He competed in three events at the 1936 Winter Olympics.

References

1921 births
1994 deaths
Belgian male speed skaters
Olympic speed skaters of Belgium
Speed skaters at the 1936 Winter Olympics
Place of birth missing